Dunfermline and West Fife is a county constituency represented in the House of Commons of the Parliament of the United Kingdom. It was created for the 2005 general election from all of the old Dunfermline West and parts of the old Dunfermline East constituencies. The current MP is Douglas Chapman of the Scottish National Party (SNP).

The Dunfermline and West Fife by-election was held in early 2006, due to the death of the sitting MP, Rachel Squire. Willie Rennie of the Liberal Democrats was the surprise winner, by some 1,800 votes, in what was seen as a safe Labour seat. However, he lost the seat to Labour's Thomas Docherty at the 2010 general election. Chapman then won the seat in the SNP's Scottish landslide in the 2015 general election.

Boundaries

This constituency was formed in 2005 from all of the old Dunfermline West and parts of the old Dunfermline East constituencies.

Rosyth and Inverkeithing in the southeast are the only large population centres on the coast. To the north and west of Dunfermline is more rugged and robust Fife countryside. The whole seat is up against the Firth of Forth.

Places in Dunfermline and West Fife constituency

Royal burghs
Culross
Dunfermline
Inverkeithing

Small burghs and large villages
Cairneyhill
Kincardine on Forth
Limekilns
North Queensferry
Rosyth

Electoral wards of Dunfermline and small, outlying villages
Baldridgeburn
Bellyeoman
Blairhall
Brucefield
Carnegie
Carnock
Comrie
Crombie
Crossford
Crossgates
Garvock
Gowkhall
Halbeath
Headwell
High Valleyfield
Hill of Beath
Kingseat
Linburn
Low Valleyfield
Milesmark
Mossside
Nethertown
Oakley
Pitcorthie
Pitreavie
Saline
Steelend
Torryburn
Townhill
Wellwood
Woodmill

Members of Parliament

Rachel Squire (Labour) was the MP for Dunfermline West constituency from 1992 until the major revision of the composition of Scottish parliamentary constituencies for the 2005 general election. Gordon Brown was MP for the neighbouring Dunfermline East constituency from which some territory was given to Dunfermline and West Fife.

Squire won the new seat in the 2005 general election and held it until her death on 5 January 2006. The subsequent by-election was held on 9 February 2006, which Liberal Democrat Willie Rennie won in a shock defeat for Labour. The Liberal Democrats also gained the Dunfermline West Scottish Parliamentary constituency from Labour in the 2007 Holyrood Parliament elections.

In the 2010 general election, the Labour candidate Thomas Docherty won the seat back. In the 2015 general election the seat was won by the SNP's Douglas Chapman.

Election results

Elections in the 2010s

Elections in the 2000s

References

External links
Boundary Commission for Scotland, UK Parliament constituencies 2005 onwards

Westminster Parliamentary constituencies in Scotland
Constituencies of the Parliament of the United Kingdom established in 2005
Politics of Fife
Politics of Dunfermline
Inverkeithing
Blairhall
Rosyth